Rhipicera mystacina is a species of beetle in the genus Rhipicera.

Description 
Rhipicera mystacina is diagnosed from related species by the reddish brown colour and the dense and white adpressed setae covering most of the pronotum.

Distribution 
Rhipicera mystacina can be found in the northern and central parts of Queensland.

References

Beetles of Australia
Beetles described in 1775
Polyphaga